The Merseyside Development Corporation was a central government-appointed Development Corporation set up in 1981 by Margaret Thatcher's government to regenerate the Mersey docks of Liverpool, Bootle, Wallasey and Birkenhead.  It was one of two Development Corporations to be set up in 1981, the other being the London Docklands Development Corporation, which also focused on disused docklands.

The first Chief Executive was Basil Bean, who had previously been general manager of the Northampton Development Corporation.  Actitivies undertaken by the Corporation include the Liverpool International Garden Festival in 1984, and the redevelopment of the Albert Dock complex, which included the opening of Tate Liverpool.

During its lifetime 7.6m sq.ft. of non-housing development and 486 housing units were built. Around 22,155 new jobs were created and some £698m of private finance was leveraged in.

The Corporation was wound up in 1998.

References

Liverpool
Organizations established in 1981
Organizations disestablished in 1998
Organisations based in Merseyside
Economy of Merseyside
Defunct public bodies of the United Kingdom
Development Corporations of the United Kingdom